Fleischmann was a band from Germany, founded about 1990, that released several albums, their most popular one being "Hunger", which made its debut in 1995.

A single was released from the album titled "Ohne Traurigkeit". They received help on the "Hunger" album from Farin Urlaub (from Die Ärzte), who assisted in the backing vocals and chorus.

Fleischmann pioneered a style called "Neue Deutsche Härte", being ancestors of successful bands like Rammstein.  Their style is a kind of a "missing link" between Metal and NDH.

Discography 
 Seewolf (single) (1991)
 Power of Limits (1992)
 Fleischwolf (1993)
 Das Treibhaus (1994)
 Hunger (with Farin Urlaub) (1995)

References

External links

 Fleischmann at MusicMight

German musical groups